On 23 May 1977, a train was hijacked near the village of De Punt, Netherlands. At around 09:00 that morning, nine armed Moluccan nationalists pulled the emergency brake and took over 50 people hostage. The hijacking lasted 20 days and ended with a raid by Dutch counter-terrorist special forces, during which two hostages and six hijackers were killed.

The same day as the train hijacking, four other South Moluccans took over a hundred hostages at an elementary school in Bovensmilde, around 20 km (12 mi) away.

The train hijacking was only the second such hijacking to take place in the Netherlands; the other, a 1975 train hijacking in Wijster, had also been perpetrated by Moluccans.

Background
After fighting for the Dutch in the Dutch East Indies, thousands of South Moluccans were forcibly exiled to the Netherlands. The Dutch government promised they would eventually get their own independent state, the Republic of South Maluku (RMS). But after about 25 years of living in temporary camps, often in poor conditions, the South Moluccans felt that the Dutch government had failed to live up to its promises. It was then that some members of the younger South Moluccan generation started a series of radical actions to bring attention to their cause.

Developments
While the train hijacking was taking place, four other South Moluccans took 105 children and five teachers hostage at a primary school in the nearby village of Bovensmilde. Both of these actions were carried out to force the (recently resigned) Dutch government to keep its promises about the RMS, break diplomatic ties with the Indonesian government and release 21 Moluccan prisoners involved in separate 1975 hostage-taking actions. An ultimatum was set for 25 May at 14:00, after which the hijackers threatened to blow up both the train and the school.

The hostages on the train were forced to help cover all the windows, preventing authorities from ascertaining what was happening inside the train; only near the end of the crisis were electronic eavesdropping devices installed by Dutch Marines. About 2,000 Marines and soldiers were stationed both at the train and school.

Dutch parliamentary elections were planned for 25 May 1977. Given the ongoing hostage crisis, leaders of the different political parties agreed to cancel their election campaigns, but the elections themselves took place on the planned date.

After their ultimatum expired, the hijackers announced new demands: an airplane at Amsterdam Schiphol Airport was to fly out all the hijackers, the 21 Moluccan prisoners, and the five teachers. Thanks to the eavesdropping devices, Justice Minister Dries van Agt (under resignation) knew that the hostages were not in danger, so the government let the second ultimatum deadline pass as well.

Negotiation

J.A. Manusama, president of the RMS at the time, and Reverend Metiarij acted as negotiators during the crisis.

Due to an illness that broke out in the school, likely caused by the food distributed there, the hijackers decided to release the children, but keep the teachers hostage. According to Doctor Frans Tutuhatunewa (later Manusama's successor as RMS president), there were no health issues with the hostages in the train, but the health of the hostages was nevertheless invoked to justify the raid on the train.

Attack
On 11 June 1977 at 05:00, almost three weeks after the start of the hijacking, six F-104 Starfighter jet fighters of the Royal Netherlands Air Force overflew the train three times at low altitude, using their deafening afterburners to disorient the hijackers and make the hostages drop to the floor of the train for greater safety. One of the Starfighter pilots was Dick Berlijn, who would go on to become Chief of Defence of the Netherlands Armed Forces.

Then, Marines of the counter-terrorist BBE special forces started firing rifles and machine guns at the train, shooting approximately 15,000 bullets in all. The Marines aimed at the first class compartments and vestibules (the sections equipped with doors between train cars) because they knew the hijackers were located there. One of the two hostages killed was in located in one such compartment, after having been allowed to stay there by the hijackers. Six of the nine train hijackers were killed in the assault.

Hijacking timeline

09:00 23 May 1977: Start of the train hijacking
 24 May: National broadcaster NOS reads the letter with the hijackers' demands
 25 May: Dutch General Elections take place; first ultimatum deadline expires
 26 May: A handcuffed hostage is taken outside the train, then taken aboard again
 28 May: Hostages clean up the train; 60 activists offer themselves as alternative hostages
 29 May: Negotiations about releasing a pregnant woman are cut off
 30 May: Second week of the crisis begins
 31 May: For the first time, the hijackers ask for a negotiator
 1 June: The hijackers ask for an ambulance, but later retract the request
 4 June: Two negotiators talk with the hijackers for hours
 5 June: Two pregnant women, including future mayor of Utrecht , are allowed to leave the train
 8 June: An ill passenger is released
 9 June: Two negotiators again speak with the hijackers for hours
 05:00 June 11: The hostage crisis ends after 482 hours

Aftermath

Three hijackers survived and were convicted to Prison sentences of six to nine years.

In 2007, a memorial service was held for the killed hijackers. Two of the surviving hijackers, having converted to Christianity, held a meeting with former victims the same year.

According to official sources, six of the hijackers were killed by bullets shot at the train from a distance. However, many Moluccans believe that the hijackers were still alive when soldiers boarded the train and that they had been executed. On 1 June 2013, reports emerged that an investigation by journalist Jan Beckers and one of the former hijackers, Junus Ririmasse, had concluded that three, and possibly four, of the hijackers had still been alive when the train was stormed, and had been executed by marines. In November 2014, media reported that Justice Minister van Agt allegedly ordered military commanders to leave no hijackers alive. An in-depth investigation, published the same month, concluded that no executions had taken place, but that unarmed hijackers had been killed by Marines. In 2018, a Dutch court ruled that the Dutch government did not have to pay compensation to relatives of two of the hijackers killed by Marines. The ruling was upheld on appeal on 1 June 2021.

In popular culture
In 2009, a Dutch- and Ambonese Malay-language television film was made about this hostage crisis, directed by Hanro Smitsman.

See also
 Republic of South Maluku
 1975 Indonesian consulate hostage crisis
 1978 Dutch province hall hostage crisis
 Attempt at kidnapping Juliana of the Netherlands
 List of hostage crises
 Terrorism in the European Union

References

External links

 Article from 1977 in Time magazine
 Article in BBC "on this day"
  Dutch Polygoon newsreel images from 1977
  Dutch Polygoon newsreel images of the military action from 1977
  Images from the armoured car unit involved in the action
  Images in the Dutch National Archive
 South Moluccan Suicide Commando in MIPT Terrorism Knowledge Base

1977 Dutch train hostage crisis
Hostage taking in the Netherlands
Moluccan Dutch
Terrorist incidents in Europe in 1977
Terrorist incidents on railway systems in Europe
Hijacking
1977 Dutch train hostage crisis
Terrorist incidents in the Netherlands in the 1970s
1977 murders in the Netherlands